Naluthara pocket is an enclave of Mahé district of Puducherry, India.

It comprises four villages: Chalakkara, Chembra, Palloor, and Pandakkal.

Geography of Puducherry
Enclaves and exclaves